Romain Chevrier (born July 26, 1983 in Clermont-Ferrand) is a French professional football player. Currently, he plays in the Championnat de France amateur for AS Yzeure.

He played on the professional level in Ligue 2 for Clermont Foot.

1983 births
Living people
French footballers
Ligue 2 players
Clermont Foot players
SO Châtellerault players
SO Romorantin players
Moulins Yzeure Foot players
Thonon Evian Grand Genève F.C. players
Sportspeople from Clermont-Ferrand
Association football defenders
Footballers from Auvergne-Rhône-Alpes